ReConStruction was the tenth occasional North American Science Fiction Convention.  It was held in Raleigh, North Carolina, on August 5–8, 2010, at the Raleigh Convention Center, Marriott City Center, and the Downtown Raleigh Sheraton. This NASFiC was held because Melbourne, Australia, was selected as the location for the 2010 Worldcon.

Guests of honor
 Guest of honor: Eric Flint
 Artist guest of honor: Brad W. Foster
 Fan guest of honor: Juanita Coulson
 Toastmaster: Toni Weisskopf

Information

Site selection
After "Australia in 2010" was selected as the World Science Fiction Convention to be held in 2010 (as "Aussiecon 4" in Melbourne), the WSFS Business Meeting directed that a written ballot election be held at Anticipation, the then-upcoming Worldcon in Montreal, Quebec, Canada, to select a NASFiC site for 2010.  Raleigh's bid was certified as the winner with 241 votes out of 276 cast and 3 invalid submissions. Although formally unopposed, the Raleigh bid was not the only location to receive the attention of the voters. Pasadena, California, received 19 votes, Durham, North Carolina, and Ridgecrest, California, each received 1 vote, and joke votes were cast for "Peggy Rae's House" and the fictional planet "Xerps".

Committee
 Chair: Warren Buff
 Treasurer: Sydnie Krause
 Secretary: Christopher Hensley
 Events: Mike Willmoth
 Facilities: Dina Krause
 Member Services: Russ Miller
 Operations: Chris Ross
 Programming: Mike Willmoth
 Publications: Tim Miller
 Publicity: Stacey Helton McConnell

Events
Awards presented at this convention included the Golden Duck Awards for children's literature, the Chesley Awards for artistic achievement, and the Sidewise Awards for alternate history fiction.

See also
 World Science Fiction Society

References

External links
 ReConStruction official website
 NASFiC official website

North American Science Fiction Convention
Culture of Raleigh, North Carolina
2010 in the United States
2010 in North Carolina